The 1952 Washington gubernatorial election took place on November 4, 1952, between incumbent governor Arthur B. Langlie of the Republican Party and U.S. Representative Hugh Mitchell of the Democratic Party. Langlie won the general election, becoming the first Washington state governor to be elected to a third term.

Primary election

Democratic U.S. Congressman Hugh Mitchell announced his candidacy for governor on March 22, seeking to fix an administration that was "falling apart at the seams". By May, Mitchell was joined by state senator Albert D. Rosellini of Seattle, State Treasurer Tom Martin, Speaker of the House Charles W. Hodde, and Charles C. Ralls in what The Seattle Times described as a "hard-to-predict contest" for the Democratic nomination. During various debates, Rosellini denounced Mitchell as a "left-winger", leaving doubts amidst the anti-communist wave of the era. Mitchell ultimately won the primary by a margin of 30,000 votes

Incumbent Governor Arthur B. Langlie, who had been elected to two non-consecutive terms in 1940 and 1948, filed his intention to run for a third term on July 17 after returning from the 1952 Republican National Convention. Dr. John E. Lydon, a Seattle sanipractor, was the only Republican to run against Langlie and was not considered a serious contender for the party nomination.

Candidates

Democratic Party

Charles W. Hodde, Speaker of the State House
Tom Martin, State Treasurer
Hugh Mitchell, U.S. Representative from the 1st district, former U.S. Senator
Charles C. Ralls
Albert D. Rosellini, State Senator from South Seattle and Majority Leader in the State Senate

Republican Party

Arthur B. Langlie, incumbent Governor
John E. Lydon

Primary election results

General election

General election results

References

Washington
1952
Gubernatorial
November 1952 events in the United States